Mahadeva Temple, Tambdi Surla is a 12th-century Shaivite temple in the Kadamba style dedicated to Lord Shiva and an active place of Hindu worship. It is an ASI protected Monument of National Importance in Goa.

History 

The temple was built in the Kadamba style from basalt, carried across the mountains from the Deccan plateau and carved by craftsmen. It is considered to be the only specimen of Kadamba architecture in basalt stone preserved and available in Goa. The temple survived untouched due to its remote location in a clearing deep in the forest at the foot of the Western Ghats which surround the site.

Religious significance and decoration 
The temple is dedicated to Lord Shiva and is reminiscent of the temples at Aihole in neighbouring Karnataka. There is a linga (symbol of Lord Shiva) mounted on a pedestal inside the inner sanctum, and local legend has it that a huge king cobra is in permanent residence in the dimly lit interior.

The temple consists of garbhagriha, antarala and a pillared Nandi mandapa built of basalt. The four pillars, embellished with intricate carvings of elephants and chains support a stone ceiling decorated with finely carved Ashtoken lotus flowers.

The intricate carvings created by skilled craftsmen adorn the interior and the sides of the building. Bas-relief figures of Lord Shiva, Lord Vishnu and Lord Brahma, with their respective consorts appear on panels at the sides of the temple. Unusually, the mandap (pillared hall) is covered with a roof of plain grey sloping slabs. The temple faces east so that the first rays of the rising sun shine on the deity. There is a small mandap and the inner sanctum is surmounted by a three-tired tower whose top is incomplete or has been dismantled sometime in the distant past.

There is a headless Nandi (bull, Shiva's vehicle) in the centre of the mandap, surrounded by four matching columns. The symbol of the Kadamba kingdom, an elephant trampling a horse is carved on the base of one of the columns. The river Ragado, (via village Keri, Sattari) flows nearby and is reachable for ritual bathing by a flight of stone steps.

The festival of Mahashivratri is celebrated with pomp and gaiety at the temple by local people residing in surrounding villages. The temple is built in a place which is quite inaccessible and away from the main settlements of the time. The temple is small compared to the average Goan temple.

Location 

Nearby village is Molem.

The temple is at the foot of the Anmod Ghat, which connects Goa to the state of Karnataka.

Gallery

References 

Shiva temples in Goa
13th-century Hindu temples
Hindu temples in South Goa district